Danny Rampling (born 15 July 1961) is an English house music DJ and is widely credited as one of the original founders of the UK's rave/club scene.

His long career began in the early 1980s playing hip-hop, soul and funk around numerous bars and clubs in London. Rampling was the first winner of the No 1 DJ in the World Award by DJ Magazine in 1991 and is a three-time DJ Awards recipient. He has reportedly sold over 1 million compilation albums.

Biography

Early career

Ibiza
During a holiday in Ibiza in 1987, Rampling, along with fellow DJs Paul Oakenfold, Nicky Holloway and Johnny Walker, attended Amnesia, a then open air nightclub in San Rafael. At the club the group were introduced to the unique eclectic style of DJ Alfredo, playing, among other genres, the new house music that had been exported from the USA. The group also discovered the music's powerful combination with the drug Ecstasy (MDMA), that reduced inhibitions and created a sense of oneness on the dance floor.

England
Upon his return to England, Rampling, along with his then wife, Jenni, attempted to recreate the Ibiza experience by promoting what is regarded as the UK's first Balearic rave club, Shoom. Shoom ran for three years, starting out at a gym in Southwark, London. It was a launching point for acid house culture, while contributing to worldwide dance culture.

Later career

Radio
Danny 'Happy' Rampling played for the original pirate Kiss (UK radio station) with the main Saturday night slot from 7 until 9 pm in the early nineties, setting many people up for a great night out with the "Love Groove Dance Party". He, along with others such as Judge Jules, were poached by BBC Radio 1.

DJ and producer
In the following years, Rampling continued his career in music as a DJ and producer, while forming a band, The Millionaire Hippies. In November 1994 he joined the BBC, presenting the "Love Groove Dance Party" on BBC Radio 1 until March 2002, making it the second longest running dance music show in radio after Pete Tong's "Essential Selection".

The mid-1990s also saw Rampling's DJing style diversify. While still playing house and garage sets, Rampling also began to headline at harder, trancier parties, e.g. 'South', at The Zap Club, in Brighton. Rampling himself referred to his newer style as 'Euro', and at this time showcased new Euro tracks, during the final thirty-minute weekly mix of his Radio 1 Show. Additionally, Rampling's Double CD Love Groove Dance Mix featured house and garage on the first CD, and 'Euro' on the second.

Retirement
In 2005, Rampling announced his retirement from DJing with the initial intention of running a restaurant, although he changed tack to focus on his property business and the 'low carbon economy'. In 2007 he returned to music and began making some on-off appearances at selected clubs. In 2008 he published a self-help ebook entitled "Everything you need to know about DJing and success". He has since returned to regular DJing. Rampling is a keen eco-entrepreneur and built ten eco-friendly carbon reductive houses in St Leonards-on-Sea, Hastings, East Sussex, England. Along with business partner Simon Hinton they launched 'Green Town Revolution', a reward and offset system to encourage individuals and small businesses to offset their  emissions. 'Carbon Neutral DJ' with Norman Jay MBE is GTR's first project.

In an interview with The Guardian in 2009, Rampling said that he was working in property development. While he does still occasionally DJ, Rampling said that "the lifestyle involves a lot of touring, flying around the world, spending weeks away from home and when you have kids it's not easy."

Awards and nominations

DJ Magazine Awards
Artists are nominated to the DJ Magazine top 100 list for each year the public decides who they rank as the World's No 1 DJ at the end of the poll. Rampling was the first winner of this award ranked as the World's No 1 DJ in 1991.

|-
| 1991
| Danny Rampling
| World's Top 100 DJs
| 

|-
| 2013
| Danny Rampling
| Best of British Outstanding Contribution
|

Top 100 DJs

DJ Awards
The DJ Awards organizes the annual electronic music DJ awards event it is the only international ceremony for DJs and also the oldest. the awards are held once a year at Pacha club in Ibiza Spain it is one of the most important accolades an artist can win or be honoured by.

Rampling has won the  "Best Radio DJ Award" once from three nominations, he also received two special awards one for "Outstanding Achievement" as well as the events highest honour the "Lifetime Achievement Award".

|-
| 1998
| Danny Rampling
| Best Radio DJ
| 
|-
| 1999
| Danny Rampling
| Best Radio DJ
| 
|-
| 2000
| Danny Rampling
| Outstanding Achievement
| 
|-
| 2001
| Danny Rampling
| Best Radio DJ
| 
|-
| 2005
| Danny Rampling
| Lifetime Achievement
|

Mix Mag DMC World Awards

|-
| 1998
| Danny Rampling
| Outstanding Contribution
|

References

External links
 – official site

Danny Rampling interview at DJ Tutor

English DJs
DJs from London
English house musicians
English record producers
English expatriates in Spain
Living people
People from Streatham
1961 births
People from Ibiza
Electronic dance music DJs